MetroLink is Halifax Regional Municipality's BRT (bus rapid transit) express bus service, operated by Halifax Transit.

The system consists of two limited-stop fully accessible express routes, connecting downtown Halifax's Scotia Square bus terminal, with the Portland Hills terminal in Cole Harbour on the Dartmouth side, and the Sackville Terminal in Lower Sackville.

History
The MetroLink service was developed in 2003 between the Halifax Regional Municipality, the Province of Nova Scotia and Transport Canada's Urban Transportation Showcase Program, a five-year program designed to demonstrate and promote urban transportation strategies in reducing greenhouse gas emissions. The program selected cities across the country to showcase a number of different initiatives in reducing greenhouse gases. Halifax Regional Municipality's $13.3 million proposal for a bus rapid transit system was chosen, and $4.1 million was given by the Government of Canada toward this project. The remainder was funded by Halifax Regional Municipality ($8.06 million), the Nova Scotia Department of Transportation and Public Works ($785,000) and the Nova Scotia Department of Energy ($80,000).

Twenty low floor buses were purchased from New Flyer Industries for the MetroLink service. These buses featured air conditioning, high-back reclining seats with foot rests, carpeted walls and ceiling to reduce road noise and vibration, a new livery and logo, and no advertisements both on the inside and outside. One of these buses, #600, was on public display on April 12, 2005 outside of City Hall. The bus was available for media and members of the general public to tour, and increase awareness of the new service.

The service was launched in phases, with the first phase on August 21, 2005. The first phase saw the construction of a new bus terminal in Cole Harbour called Portland Hills Terminal, with a 230-space parking lot, including some spaces reserved for carpool parking. Two routes were created at this time, the 159 Portland Hills Link and 165 Woodside Link.

The second phase was launched on February 20, 2006. This phase saw the construction of a new bus terminal in Lower Sackville called the Sackville Terminal on Walker Ave, with a 315-space parking lot. One new route was created, the 185 Sackville Link.

Routes

159 Portland Hills Link
The route 159 provides express service between the Portland Hills Terminal in Cole Harbour and the Scotia Square Terminal in downtown Halifax via Portland Street, Alderney Drive, Wyse Road, the Angus L. Macdonald Bridge and Barrington Street.  The route is a limited-stop service, with stops at the Portland Hills Terminal, Penhorn Terminal, Alderney Gate Terminal, Bridge Terminal, and Scotia Square Terminal. As a result, the total one-way trip time is about 13 minutes.

The route 159 operates Monday to Friday every 30-minutes during off-peak times, and every 10-minutes during peak (rush hour) periods. The route does not operate on weekends or holidays.

165 Woodside Link (discontinued 2014)
The route 165 provided direct express service between the Portland Hills Terminal in Cole Harbour and the Woodside Ferry Terminal via Portland Street and Highway 111.  Passengers can transfer to and from the ferry, which provides direct service to downtown Halifax.

The route 165 operated Monday to Friday during peak (rush hour) periods only, every 30-minutes.  On May 20, 2014, coinciding with an expansion of the Woodside ferry service, route 165 was discontinued.  It was replaced with a new urban express route 79, fully integrated with Metro Transit's conventional bus service.

185 Sackville Link (discontinued 2019)
The route 185 provides express service between the Sackville Terminal in Lower Sackville and the Scotia Square Terminal in downtown Halifax via Highway 101 and the Bedford Bypass, the Magazine Hill, Windmill Road the A. Murray MacKay Bridge and Barrington Street.  The route is a limited-stop service, with stops at the Sackville Terminal, Wright Avenue in the Burnside Industrial Park, and the Scotia Square Terminal. As a result, the total one-way trip time is about 24 minutes.

The route 185 operates Monday to Friday every 30-minutes during off-peak times, and every 10-minutes during peak (rush hour) periods.  The route does not operate on weekends or holidays.

Fare Structure
Effective September 30, 2013
The MetroLink service has its own fare structure, separate from the rest of the Metro Transit system. Cash fares cost an extra fifty cents over and above the regular fares. MetroLink has its own monthly bus pass, the MetroLink Pass, which can be used on any Metro Transit service. Passengers may use regular transit tickets or monthly bus passes (MetroPass), but must deposit an additional fifty cents into the farebox.

Vehicles

In 2005, Halifax Regional Municipality purchased twenty new buses from New Flyer Industries of Winnipeg, Manitoba. It was assumed at the time that HRM would purchase New Flyer's D40i Invero model, which New Flyer was marketing towards BRT services, however HRM resisted and ordered 20 model D40LF instead, and were given fleet numbers 600 - 619. The D40LF was the current bus of choice for Metro Transit's regular fleet, so they opted to keep the status quo.

These twenty buses feature a new livery on the outside, air conditioning on the inside (a first for Metro Transit),  bike racks, carpeting on the walls and ceiling to reduce road noise and vibrations, and larger plush high-back reclining chairs with arm and leg rests and custom designed fabric design. Also differing these buses from the rest of the Metro Transit fleet are onboard transmitters for the 3M Opticom system. Opticom is the system in place in HRM used by fire services and MetroLink, to allow emergency and transit vehicles to hold green lights and prevent them from turning red until the vehicle has got through the intersection. The system is also used to trigger transit priority signals at certain intersections, allowing MetroLink buses to move into the intersection using special bus-only lanes before the rest of the vehicles can proceed. This allows MetroLink buses at a red light to "jump" ahead of waiting cars.

Infrastructure

Bus stops
Part of Halifax Regional Municipality's plans for distinguishing the MetroLink service from the rest of the Metro Transit system involved creating special bus stop signs, bus shelters and info posts at MetroLink bus stops. The new bus stop signs feature the same colours and design as the livery on the buses, the new shelters feature the gold and blue MetroLink "swirl" along the back wall, and the new info posts, which display maps and schedule information for the three MetroLink routes, are also done in the same gold and blue swirl, with the stop name vertically oriented along the side.

Traffic changes
A number of changes were made to streets and intersections along the routes to help the MetroLink buses get ahead of the rest of traffic. The following changes were introduced:

 Bus-only lanes and traffic priority signals along Portland Street in Dartmouth for the route 159 and 165. The lanes and signals are located at the intersection of Portland Street and Woodlawn Road. The bus-only lanes allow the MetroLink buses to bypass traffic waiting at a red light. Just before the light turns green, a special transit priority signal (a white vertical bar above the red stop light) comes on, allowing the bus to enter the intersection ahead of waiting vehicles.
 Bus-only lanes and traffic priority signals along Windmill Road in the Burnside Industrial Park for the route 185. The lanes and signals are located at the intersections of Windmill Road, Wright Ave and Akerley Blvd. They work in the same manner as described above.

Future development
Phase three of the MetroLink service is expected to take place within the next five years. This phase will see new terminals and MetroLink routes in other busy corridors such as Clayton Park and Spryfield.

Plans existed to introduce a new route to service the Cobequid Terminal, also in Lower Sackville shortly after the 185 Sackville Link came into service. Destination signs on board the buses were even programmed with a route 184 Cobequid, and early maps of the MetroLink service showed a route 184 between Cobequid Terminal and downtown Halifax, however this plan seems to have been abandoned.

159 Portland Hills Link
165 Woodside Link
185 Sackville Link

Impacts

 The route 185 Sackville Link has improved transit connections to downtown Halifax from Lower Sackville, since standard bus service on routes 87 & 1 takes 43 minutes in optimal conditions, and bus service on the route 80 (which travels via Bedford) takes 1 hour 10 minutes.
 Both routes 159 Portland Hills Link and 185 Sackville Link saw unprecedented ridership in the first few months of service. Initial rush hour schedules saw both routes running on 15-minute frequencies, however within months this was changed to 10-minutes. Also, both Portland Hills Terminal and the Sackville Terminal recently underwent expansions to their parking lots, bringing the combined capacity of both lots to 545 cars. Still, both parking lots are frequently full, with people parking on the driveways to the lots.

References

External links
 Metro Transit's MetroLink website

Transport in Halifax, Nova Scotia
Transit agencies in Nova Scotia
Bus transport in Nova Scotia
Paratransit services in Canada
Bus rapid transit in Canada